The Dry Dock Complex consists of six interconnected buildings located at 1801–1803 Atwater Street in Detroit, Michigan, as well as the remains of a nearby dry dock at 1900 Atwater Street.  The 1801-1803 Atwater complex is also known as the Globe Trading Company Building, and in 2015 was opened by the Michigan Department of Natural Resources as the Outdoor Adventure Center. 

The complex is significant as a historic maritime manufacturing facility.  The earliest structure, an 1892 machine shop, is also significant as an early example of an industrial building entirely supported by its steel frame, but using traditional brick and standard windows to infill the curtain walls.  The complex was listed on the National Register of Historic Places in 2009. In 2012, the Department of Natural Resources received funding for historic redevelopment of the complex, along the city's east riverfront promenade.

History 
The Dry Dock Engine Works-Detroit Dry Dock Company Complex includes pieces of two once-independent companies—the Dry Dock Engine Works and the Detroit Dry Dock Company—which merged in 1899.

Detroit Dry Dock Company 

In the 1840s, Captain Stephen R. Kirby began a shipbuilding firm in Cleveland, Ohio, and by 1852 had moved to Saginaw, Michigan.  In 1870, Kirby's son Frank, a Cooper Union-trained engineer, joined the firm as lead designer.  (Frank Kirby went on to a successful shipbuilding career, which included the design of two National Historic Landmarks: the Columbia and the Ste. Claire.) In 1872, the Kirby's firm purchased a shipyard in Wyandotte, Michigan.

In 1852, Campbell, Wolverton and Company opened a ship repair yard on the Detroit River at the foot of Orleans Street.  In 1860 the firm, now known (with the addition of John Owen as president) as Campbell & Owen, constructed a 260' dry dock in the same location.  They constructed their first steamship in 1867.

In 1877, Campbell & Owen reorganized, changing its name to the Detroit Dry Dock Company.  At about the same time, Detroit Dry Dock purchased the Kirby's Wyandotte shipbuilding firm.  Also in the late 1870s, railroad and shipping magnate James McMillan became interested in shipbuilding, purchasing shares in Detroit Dry Dock.  By 1890, McMillan was president of the company, and by 1892 was also president of the nearby Dry Dock Engine Works.

Dry Dock Engine Works 

Dry Dock Engine Works, a marine engine manufacturer, was formed in 1866 by William Cowie, Edward Jones, and Robert Donaldson, with Cowie as president.   The firm set up shop on Atwater, between Orleans and Dequindre, across from the dry dock firm that was then called Campbell & Owen.  The firm slowly acquired surrounding lots, and by 1880 owned nearly the entire city block back to Guoin Street. (The city vacated Dequindre in the vicinity of the Dry Dock Engine Works in 1917, and Guoin some time later; neither street currently exists in the area.)

The main product line of the Dry Dock Engine Works was marine engines, and they produced 129 engines between 1867 and 1894.  However, the firm also produced stationary and portable steam engines, as well as mining equipment, mill gearing, and brass and iron casting.  In 1883, Dry Dock Engine Works bought the nearby boiler shop of Desotell & Hudson, expanding their product line.

Although unimportant at the time, the Dry Dock Engine Works is significant as an early employer of Henry Ford.  The future automobile magnate worked at the firm between 1880 and 1882 as an apprentice machinist.  His work with steam engines at the Dry Dock Engine Works inspired in part Ford's later idea of adding an engine to a carriage for road use.

The Dry Dock Engine Works had always had a special relationship with the nearby Detroit Dry Dock Company, which only increased as the years passed.  In the 1870s, Dry Dock Engine Works sold over 1/3 of their engines to Detroit Dry Dock; by the early 1890s that fraction had increased to nearly 2/3.  The ties were enhanced by the fact that Frank Kirby, John Owen, and James McMillan of Detroit Dry Dock slowly acquired shares in Dry Dock Engine Works.  By the end of the 1880s, virtually all of the Dry Dock Engine Works shares were owned by Detroit Dry Dock principals.  In 1892, James McMillan took over the presidency of Dry Dock Engine Works, and the two firms were controlled by the same person.  It was around this time that the oldest of the remaining structures in the complex, the machine shop and dry dock no. 2, were built.

Integration: Detroit Shipbuilding Company 

Although even after 1892 the two firms were technically separate, they essentially operated as a single business unit, with the same principals in charge of both.  In 1899, this relationship became more formal, as the Dry Dock Engine Works, the Detroit Dry Dock Company, and the Detroit Sheet Metal and Brass Works were combined to form the Detroit Shipbuilding Company, which itself was a subsidiary of the American Shipbuilding Company headquartered in Cleveland, Ohio.  The integration of these operating units created a substantial company: in 1900, the Detroit Shipbuilding Company employed 1337 people, and was the fourth-largest employer in Detroit.

A few years later, in 1902, the Detroit Shipbuilding Company built two more still-surviving structures, the foundry and the industrial loft building.  Sometime in the 1910s, three more structures were built, which completed the enclosure of the block where the original Dry Dock Engine Company was founded, and represent the latest of the surviving buildings of the complex.

Shipbuilding continued at the facilities in Wyandotte and Detroit through the 1920s, with a substantial number of ships constructed in the World War I years of 1917-1919.  However, business soon decreased and in 1920 the yard in Wyandotte was closed as a cost-cutting measure.  Not long afterward, in 1924, a pair of steamers were fitted up in the Detroit yards; these two proved to be the last vessels constructed in Detroit by the American Shipbuilding Company.  The Detroit Shipbuilding Company completely ceased operations in 1929.

Use post-maritime construction 
The property owned by the Detroit Shipbuilding Company at Atwood and Orleans passed through several hands, being used by a cabinet shop and a stove manufacturer in the early 1930s.  In 1935, the property was acquired by the Detroit Edison Company.  It is unclear what use, if any, Detroit Edison put the property to in the 1930s and 40s, but in the 1950s and 60s Edison used the engine-building plant as a reconditioning and appliance shop.  By 1968, the property was occupied by the Globe Trading Company, a machinery and mill supplies dealer.  In 1981, Edison sold the property to Globe.  At some time later, the property was abandoned, and by 2002 was empty and owned by the city of Detroit.

Redevelopment 
To facilitate the renovation, in 2007, the city received an Environmental Protection Agency brownfields grant to clean up the building. However, the economic downturn in 2008-2009 forced a reconsideration of the renovation project, and the project plan was converted to incorporate rental units. The redevelopment was intended to be financed in part by the Department of Housing and Urban Development and in part by using historic tax credits, made possible by the inclusion of the complex on the National Register of Historic Places in 2009.

Instead of the proposed housing development, in 2013 the Michigan Department of Natural Resources began renovating the building into the Outdoor Adventure Center. This development involved demolition of portions of the historic building complex. The center opened in 2015.

Buildings and Structures 

The Dry Dock Engine Works began manufacturing engines on Atwater Street in 1867; however, the earliest buildings used by the company were replaced by later buildings, built between 1892 and 1919.  These early structures were located throughout the city block owned by the company, and included a sheet metal works, boiler shop, forge, machine shop, and the Dry Dock Hotel. The Detroit Dry Dock Company began shipbuilding in the same area as early as 1852.  Their earlier dry docks, including Dry Dock No. 1, no longer exist. A complex of six buildings, as well as Dry Dock No. 2, do remain.

Detroit Dry Dock Co. Dry Dock No. 2 (1892) 
In 1892, the Detroit Dry Dock Company constructed a new dry dock near the foot of Orleans Street, just west of their original dry dock facility. Over two thousand piles were driven into the ground to support the dock. As constructed, the dock could be flooded in twenty minutes and pumped dry in about ninety minutes. The dock was sized to be able to accommodate any vessel traveling on the Great Lakes at that time, and could house even fully loaded vessels.

A monument with sculpture depicting the Dry Dock and the steamer Pioneer is located at the north end of the dry dock.

Dry Dock Engine Works Machine Shop (1892) 

Also in 1892, Detroit Dry Dock built a machine shop at the corner of Atwater and Orleans, running parallel to Orleans.  The shop replaced a portion of the earlier machine shop which fronted on Atwater.  The building was designed and built by Berlin Iron Bridge Company, a firm from Connecticut now part of the American Bridge Company.  The building featured a load-bearing steel frame and non-load-bearing brick curtain walls, at the time a novel construction technique.   Also in 1892, Berlin Iron Bridge also built a boiler shop of the same construction across Dequindre from the main complex; this building has since been demolished.

Description 
The building consists of thirteen bays dividing the length into , with the northernmost bay a full  wider.

Pediment walls at each end of the building rise above the roof and are capped with limestone. Two windows per bay were included along the west side. The original windows were replaced sometime between 1912 and 1932. The building originally had two large doorways on the west side; these have since been bricked in. A  runs most of the length of the roof. Although now covered with sheet metal, the sides and roof of the monitor were originally glass.

Background 
The 1892 machine shop was constructed to take advantage of what was at the time the most modern innovations applied to manufacturing buildings: electric drive machinery and an electrically driven traveling overhead crane.  The tall, wide construction of the building, containing an open space lacking support columns, reflects the desire to implement the crane into the company's manufacturing process.  In fact, contemporaneous material from the Detroit Dry Dock Company extols the virtues of the open plan of the building, the "great advantages of light and air" afforded by the skylight and windows, and the effectiveness of the crane.

The open space in the building was possible due to the construction of the building in what was at the time a novel method.  Steel frame construction had emerged in 1880s Chicago in the construction of office buildings, the first being the nine-story Home Insurance Building, constructed in 1884.  However, the first building to be completely supported by a riveted all-steel frame was the 1889 Rand McNally Building.  The steel frame allowed the exterior walls to be reduced to a simple curtain covering the frame, rather than supporting the weight of the building.  The Berlin Iron Bridge Company, already experienced in riveted steel construction through their bridge construction, moved into the design and construction of steel-framed industrial buildings at some time in the late 1880s.

Significance 
The machine shop is an early example of an industrial building which was entirely supported by a rigid structural steel frame, with exterior walls that were merely a curtain around the structure.  This building may very well have been the first such structure in Detroit.

The particular design used by the Berlin Iron Bridge Company represented a conservative, hybrid design. The steel frame completely supported the structure, but the non-load-bearing curtain walls were nonetheless designed the same way as traditional brick load-bearing walls.  The windows in the infill were standard-sized windows arranged in a traditional two per bay, side-by-side configuration.

The construction gave the Dry Dock Engine Works the advantages of the open interior space provided by the steel frame construction combined with the more substantial, traditional appearance afforded by the brick exterior.  In addition, the brick gave some protection from cold during winter months, with enough windows to maximize the interior light.  This particular building exemplifies a link between the traditional past style of industrial architecture and the revolutionary change represented by steel framing.

Eric J. Hill and John Gallagher, in their American Institute of Architects guide to Detroit architecture, state that this building is perhaps "the most important surviving nineteenth-century industrial building in Detroit."

Machine Shop photo gallery

Industrial Loft Building and Foundry (1902) 
In 1902, the company constructed two structures: the Industrial Loft Building and a foundry.  The Industrial Loft Building ran along Atwater from the east side of the machine shop to what was then Dequindre.  The loft building fronted on Atwood, stretching from the machine shop to Dequindre; the foundry faced Dequindre north of the loft building, completing the enclosure of the entire city block from Atwood to Guoin and Orleans to Dequindre.

Foundry 

The building is divided into seven . Clerestory windows run the length of the building.

Like the machine shop, the foundry is constructed with a load-bearing steel frame sheathed with non-load-bearing brick.  The interior bays ran the full height of the building to make room for an overhead crane.

The foundry building operated as a foundry for only a little over a decade.  Sometime in the 1910s, the company built a new foundry and this building was converted into an erecting shop. At some time afterward, possibly as late as the 1950s, the southernmost bay of the building was turned into a loading dock with the addition of an interior concrete block wall.  Balconies above the dock were constructed, likely for storage.

Industrial Loft Building 

At the same time as the foundry was constructed, the Detroit Shipbuilding Company also built a three-story loft building.

The building was originally occupied by a blacksmith's shop, bolt-cutter, and office space on the first floor, a pattern shop and tool room on the second floor, and engineering offices and storage on the third floor.  In addition, two narrow drives passed through the first floor to an interior courtyard.  These drives were later bricked in.  Other alterations of the facade over time include bricking in of windows on the east side and the addition of doors on the south side.

Like the machine shop and foundry, the loft building had a steel-framed structure with brick curtain walls.  The framing supported the loads on the floors as well as the weight of the roof.  The steel framing, however, was wholly contained within the building rather than being encased in the brick.

Machine shop addition, chipping room, and shipping/receiving (c. 1910s) 

Sometime between 1910 and 1919, three more structures were built, enclosing the yard between the 1892 machine shop and the 1902 foundry.

Machine shop addition 
A roof monitor extended the height another . It was built along the east side of the 1892 machine shop; the brick in-fill of the machine shop was removed to provide a continuous inner area. The north wall of the structure had a large steel-framed window wall, although the lower portion of it is now bricked in.

The interior of the addition was originally a wide, open space with an overhead crane similar to the one in the original machine shop.  However, some time after 1922 a wooden floor was constructed within the building to provide a second story on top of a  first-floor bay.

Chipping room 
Some time later, a chipping room was built along the north end of the block between the machine shop addition and the foundry building, displacing remnants of earlier buildings in the same place. The chipping room was where surface imperfections of castings were removed. This structure is also steel-framed, sharing its columns with adjacent buildings on the east and west. Much of the north side was originally steel-framed windows; these have since been covered with blocks.

Shipping/receiving 
In 1918, the company constructed a shipping/receiving building in the center of the complex, within what was previously an interior courtyard.  This structure is a two-story steel-framed building measuring 5 by 72 feet (1.5 m × 22 m).  The first floor was originally a shipping/receiving area, with access to Atwater via the drives running through the industrial loft building.  The second floor functioned as a stockroom.  A roof monitor provided light for the second floor, but the completely encased first floor required artificial lighting.

References

External links 
Outdoor Adventure Center
Detroit Dry Dock Company, Around the Lakes: Containing a Full List of American Lake Vessels, and Addresses of Managing Owners, Condensed Statistics of the Lake Business, and a Historical Resume and Illustrations of the Plant, and Vessels Built by the Detroit Dry Dock Company, Detroit, Mich. ship and Engine Builders, Marine Review Print., Cleveland, 1894.

Berlin Iron Bridge Company  history
Video of the structure
Inside the abandoned Dry Dock Complex
Detroit Dry Dock complex photos by  Kathy Toth

Historic American Engineering Record in Michigan
National Register of Historic Places in Detroit
Shipyards of the United States
Warehouse districts of the United States
Shipyards on the National Register of Historic Places
Transportation buildings and structures in Michigan
Industrial buildings and structures in Detroit